Jerome Clarke (born 15 July 1951, in Drogheda) is an Irish former footballer.

Career 
He played for Drogheda United and won his only cap for the Republic of Ireland national football team when he replaced Johnny Giles 12 minutes from time in a 3–0 friendly defeat to Poland national football team on 12 April 1978 in Łódź.

A striker, he was part of the Drogheda team which reached the 1976 FAI Cup final which they lost 1-0 to Bohemians. After 12 seasons at his home town club he joined rivals Dundalk in July 1980.

Honours 
League of Ireland: 1
 Dundalk F.C. 1981/82League of Ireland Cup: 1 Dundalk F.C. 1981/82

References

Drogheda United F.C. players
Dundalk F.C. players
League of Ireland players
League of Ireland XI players
Republic of Ireland association footballers
Republic of Ireland international footballers
1951 births
Living people
Association football forwards